The S90 is a railway service that runs every half-hour between  and  in the Swiss canton of Ticino. The S90 uses the traditional Gotthard line, making local stops bypassed by the Ceneri Base Tunnel. Treni Regionali Ticino Lombardia (TILO), a joint venture of Swiss Federal Railways and Trenord, operates the service.

Operations 
All other scheduled passenger services use the Ceneri Base Tunnel between Giubiasco and Lugano. South of Lugano, the S90 supplements the RE80 and S10 / S50.

History 
The S90 was introduced on 5 April 2021, when the completion of the Ceneri Base Tunnel permitted a major reorganization of regional railway services in Ticino. The S90 replaced the S10 and S50 between Giubiasco and Lugano, as both services were re-routed through the tunnel, saving 12 minutes.

References

External links 
 Official site

Rail transport in Ticino